Ruth Ann Buzzi (born July 24, 1936) is an American actress and comedian. She has appeared on stage, in films, and on television. She is best known for her performances on the comedy-variety show Rowan & Martin's Laugh-In from 1968 to 1973, for which she won a Golden Globe Award and received five Emmy nominations.

Early life
Buzzi was born at Westerly Hospital, Westerly, Rhode Island, the daughter of Rena Pauline and Angelo Peter Buzzi, a nationally recognized stone sculptor. Her father, who came from a Swiss family, immigrated from Arzo, Switzerland in 1923. She was raised in the village of Wequetequock in the town of Stonington, Connecticut, in a rock house overlooking the ocean at Wequetequock Cove, where her father owned Buzzi Memorials, a business that her older brother Harold operated until his retirement in 2013.

Buzzi attended Stonington High School, where she was head cheerleader. At 17, she enrolled at the Pasadena Playhouse for the Performing Arts, from which she graduated with honors.

Career

Early successes
Before graduation from college, Buzzi was already a working actress with a union card in musical and comedy revues.  Her first job in show business was at 19, traveling with singer Rudy Vallee in a live musical and comedy act during her summer break from college; it allowed her to graduate with an Actors' Equity Association union card. She moved to New York City after graduation and was hired immediately for a lead role in an off-Broadway musical revue, the first of 19 in which she performed around the East Coast. She worked alongside other young performers just beginning their careers at the time, including Barbra Streisand, Joan Rivers, Dom DeLuise, Bernadette Peters, and Carol Burnett. She performed in New York musical variety shows, and she made numerous television commercials, some of which won national awards including the Clio Award. 

Her first national recognition on television came on The Garry Moore Show in 1964, just after Carol Burnett was replaced by Dorothy Loudon on the series. She performed as "Shakundala the Silent", a bumbling magician's assistant to her comedy partner Dom DeLuise, who played "Dominic the Great". Buzzi was a member of the regular repertory company on the CBS variety show The Entertainers (1964–65). In 1966–67, she appeared in Sweet Charity with Bob Fosse's wife Gwen Verdon in the original cast. She had several small roles, including "the Singing Fairy".

On Laugh-In and related work
In 1967, Buzzi appeared in all eight episodes of The Steve Allen Comedy Hour, a variety series starring Steve Allen. Her character parts in the Allen sketches led her to be cast for NBC's new show Rowan and Martin's Laugh-In. She was the only featured player to appear in every episode of Laugh-In including the pilot for the show and the Laugh-In television special.  Among her recurring characters on Laugh-In were Flicker Farkle, youngest of the Farkle family; Busy-Buzzi, a Hedda Hopper-type Hollywood gossip columnist; Doris Swizzler, a cocktail-lounge habituée who always got smashed with husband Leonard (Dick Martin); and one of the Burbank Airlines Stewardesses, inconsiderate flight attendants.

Her most famous character was "spinster" Gladys Ormphby, clad in drab brown with her bun hairdo covered by a visible hairnet knotted in the middle of her forehead. Buzzi first used this look when she played Agnes Gooch in a school production of Auntie Mame. In most sketches, she used her purse as a weapon, with which she would flail away vigorously at anyone who incurred her wrath. She most often was the unwilling object of the advances of Arte Johnson's "dirty old man" character Tyrone F. Horneigh. NBC collectively called these two characters The Nitwits when they went to animation in the mid-1970s as part of the series Baggy Pants and the Nitwits. Buzzi and Johnson both voiced their respective roles in the cartoon.

Buzzi was featured as Gladys in many of the Dean Martin Roasts from the MGM Grand Hotel in Las Vegas, ranting about notable roastees including Muhammad Ali, Frank Sinatra, and Lucille Ball. In each case, Gladys pugnaciously attacked the honoree with her purse, and she would also hit Martin when he made disparaging remarks about her looks and her romantic prospects.

Continued success on television
Buzzi was featured as a semi-regular on the comedy That Girl as Marlo Thomas's friend Margie "Pete" Peterson. She starred with Jim Nabors as the time-traveling androids Fi and Fum in The Lost Saucer produced by Sid and Marty Krofft which aired from September 11, 1975, until September 2, 1976 (16 episodes).

In 1979, she co-starred on the Canadian kid's comedy show You Can't Do That on Television (also known as Whatever Turns You On).

Buzzi also guest-starred as Chloe, the wife of phone company worker Henry Beesmeyer (Marvin Kaplan) on Alice in 1981. She was also a guest star on Down to Earth in 1985. Dean Martin's producer Greg Garrison hired her for his comedy specials starring Dom DeLuise. She recorded the single "You Oughta Hear The Song" in 1977 which reached number 90 on Billboard's national Country Music chart; Buzzi joked in 2022 in hindsight: "Here’s a medley of my hit song:  I’d like to thank the millions and millions of you who didn’t buy a copy.  I got to spend quality time at home in ‘78 instead of standing in front of all those aggravating audiences."

Buzzi was a guest star on many television series, including Donny & Marie, The Flip Wilson Show, The Dean Martin Music and Comedy Hour, the Dean Martin Roasts, The Carol Burnett Show, Tony Orlando and Dawn, The Monkees, Emergency!, and variety series hosted by Leslie Uggams and by Glen Campbell. She also appeared occasionally on game shows and was a celebrity judge on The Gong Show. She appeared on Lucille Ball's last comedy Life with Lucy as Mrs. Wilcox in the episode "Lucy Makes a Hit with John Ritter". She appeared eight times on The Tonight Show Starring Johnny Carson and has made more than 200 other television guest appearances. 

Buzzi voiced the character Nose Marie in the Hanna-Barbera animated series Pound Puppies (1986). She also voiced Mama Bear in Berenstain Bears (1985) and performed hundreds of guest voices for many other cartoon series, including The Smurfs, The Angry Beavers, and Mo Willems' Sheep in the Big City. 

She joined the cast of Sesame Street in 1993 as shopkeeper, Ruthie, as part of the Around the Corner set expansion. Ruthie ran Finders Keepers, which sold items previously owned by fairy tale and nursery rhyme characters. After the set was removed in 1999 she continued to appear on the show, often in inserts, usually in costume as other characters. She also voiced Suzie Kabloozie and her pet cat, Feff in animated inserts that were shown on the show from 1994 to 2008. She reprised her role as Ruthie in Sesame Street Stays Up Late, Sesame Street's All Star 25th Birthday: Stars and Street Forever and Elmopalooza as well as the direct-to-video production, The Best of Elmo and the feature film The Adventures of Elmo in Grouchland.

Buzzi performed in numerous national television commercials, most notably for Clorox 2, Clairol, Ban roll-on deodorant, and Santa Anita Park, and she voiced Granny Goodwitch in television commercials for Sugar Crisp cereal. She originated the Goodwitch character in the animated TV series Linus the Lionhearted (1964–65). 

Buzzi appeared in the "Weird Al" Yankovic video "Gump" and similarly appeared in other music videos with the B-52's and The Presidents of the United States of America. She appeared on Saved by the Bell, The Muppet Show, two episodes of You Can't Do That on Television in 1979 (as well as the entire run of the You Can't Do That On Television'''s spinoff Whatever Turns You On), and numerous other television shows. She played the role of the eccentric Nurse Kravitz on NBC's daytime soap opera Passions. In 2006 and 2007, she made guest appearances on the children's TV series Come on Over. 

Buzzi had a successful nightclub act across the United States, including at Las Vegas's Sahara and at the MGM Grand hotels. She performed the act for one year. Her shows all sold out and she was reportedly offered an extended stay but declined.

She had featured roles in more than 20 films, including Chu Chu and the Philly Flash, Freaky Friday, The North Avenue Irregulars, The Apple Dumpling Gang Rides Again, The Villain, The Adventures of Elmo in Grouchland, and a number of westerns for the European market known as the Lucky Luke series in which she plays the mother of the Dalton Gang. 

In 2021, she announced on her social media account that she officially retired from acting.

Filmography
Film

Television

Awards
 Five Emmy Award nominations and won the Golden Globe Award from the Hollywood Foreign Press Association in 1973 for her work on Laugh-In On November 22, 2014, Women in Film (Dallas, Texas chapter) awarded Buzzi their highest achievement honor, the Topaz Award, at their annual gala.
 She was inducted in 2002 into the NAB Broadcasting Hall of Fame, which bestowed the honor to the producers, director and entire cast of Laugh-In 
 In 1971 she was inducted into the Rhode Island Heritage Hall of Fame.
 Lifetime Achievement Award by the Pasadena Playhouse of the Performing Arts
 Clio Award for Best Spokesperson in a television commercial for her series of Clorox-2 commercials, and was among the first of only a few Caucasian women to ever win an NAACP Image Award
 Buzzi was named a "Distinguished Woman of Northwood" by the Board of Regents of Northwood University in 2008

Personal life and health
Buzzi is a charter member of the Pasadena Playhouse Alumni Association. She paints as a hobby; she has never offered her oil paintings for sale to the public, but has donated original works to charity, where they have sold in excess of $6,000.

Buzzi supports numerous children's charities, including Make a Wish Foundation, the Special Olympics, The Thalians, St. Jude's Hospital, and Big Brothers Big Sisters of America, and she is a children's art summer camp sponsor through Dallas Museum of Biblical Art. She is active in fund raising for the Utopia Animal Rescue Ranch in Medina, Texas and other animal causes.

Buzzi lives with her husband Kent Perkins on a  cattle and horse ranch near Stephenville, Texas. The couple are avid automobile collectors. Their collection focuses on post-war English vehicles, including Bentley, Rolls-Royce, and Jaguar, although it also includes several American convertibles and muscle cars. Some of her vehicles have been in television commercials and featured in parades, and her blue Bentley convertible was featured on the cover of Vogue'' with Jessica Simpson behind the wheel. Some of their cars have been donated or lent to the Petersen Automotive Museum in Los Angeles, California including a red, fuel-injected 1957 Chevrolet convertible that was exhibited from 1993 to 2011 as part of the display honoring the cars of Steve McQueen. Buzzi's 1960 Rolls-Royce Silver Cloud drophead coupe convertible was on display for the "Century of Elegance" exhibit.

Buzzi has been named in numerous songs, including House of Pain's "I'm A Swing It", The Bled's "Ruth Buzzi Better Watch Her Back", and the Loretta Lynn/Conway Twitty duet "You're the Reason Our Kids Are Ugly".

On July 19, 2022, Buzzi suffered a series of strokes.

References

External links

 
 
 
 
 
 Ruth Buzzi on Twitter
 Topaz Winner, popcultureblog.dallasnews.com (November 2014)

20th-century American actresses
20th-century American comedians
21st-century American actresses
21st-century American comedians
Actresses from Rhode Island
American women singers
American film actresses
American musical theatre actresses
American people of Swiss-Italian descent
American sketch comedians
American stage actresses
American television actresses
American voice actresses
American women comedians
Best Supporting Actress Golden Globe (television) winners
Living people
People from Stephenville, Texas
People from Stonington, Connecticut
People from Westerly, Rhode Island
American people of Italian descent
1936 births